The Bojanowicz Collection is an important collection of Polish stamps and postal history of 1938-1946 that forms part of the British Library Philatelic Collections where it complements the Kaluski Collection. The collection was formed by Mirosław Bojanowicz and donated in 1966.

The collection includes:
Lodz ghetto post.
Underground posts.
Warsaw Scout post.
Polish Government in Exile material.
Prisoner of War mail.
Polish Free Forces material.

See also
Kaluski Collection
Postage stamps and postal history of Poland

References

British Library Philatelic Collections
Philately of Poland